In the human brain, the entorhinal cortex appears as a longitudinal elevation anterior to the parahippocampal gyrus, with a corresponding internal furrow, the external rhinal sulcus (or rhinal fissure), separating it from the inferiolateral surface of the hemisphere close to the lamina terminalis. It is analogous to the collateral fissure found further caudally in the inferior part of the temporal lobe.

References

External links
 http://www.sylvius.com/?s=248&i=str-208&l=1

Sulci (neuroanatomy)